was a Japanese swimmer. He competed at the 1960 Summer Olympics and won a silver medal in the 200 metre breaststroke and a bronze medal in the 4×100 m medley relay.

In 1984, Osaki helped establish the Japan Masters Swimming Association and served on its board until his death. During those years he popularized masters swimming both in Japan and internationally. In 1986, he organized the first FINA World masters championships in Tokyo, and since 1993 participated in every international masters competition. He had competed in five age groups, set 9 world masters records and won 7 world titles. In 2006 he was inducted into the International Swimming Hall of Fame in the Contributors category.

Osaki died of interstitial pneumonia, aged 76. He was survived by two daughters, a son, and wife Yoshiko Sato, a fellow masters and Olympic swimmer.

References

1939 births
2015 deaths
Olympic swimmers of Japan
Olympic silver medalists for Japan
Olympic bronze medalists for Japan
Swimmers at the 1960 Summer Olympics
Olympic bronze medalists in swimming
Medalists at the 1960 Summer Olympics
Japanese male breaststroke swimmers
Olympic silver medalists in swimming
20th-century Japanese people